Villers-la-Ville is a municipality of Wallonia located in the Belgian province of Walloon Brabant. On January 1, 2006, Villers-la-Ville had a total population of 9,572. The total area is 47.45 km2 which gives a population density of 202 inhabitants per km2. The municipality includes also the villages of Marbais, Mellery, Sart-Dames-Avelines and Tilly.

History
To be expanded

Sites

To the north of the village lie the ruins of the Villers Abbey, which was one of the most important Cistercian abbeys of Europe. It was founded in 1147 and destroyed by the French republicans in 1795. In the ruined church attached to the abbey the tombstones of several dukes of Brabant of the 13th and 14th centuries are still to be found.

The ruins also appear in the final episode of season 2 of sense8.

Postal history
The MARBAIS post office opened on 1 June 1838. It used postal distribution code 33 with bars (before 1864), and code 235 with points before 1874. 
The VILLERS-LA-VILLE post-office opened on 10 February 1865. SART-DAMES-AVELINES on 15 October 1877, TILLY on 8 November 1906.

Postal codes in 1969:
6318 Marbais
6320 Villers-la-Ville
6321 Tilly
6322 Mellery
6328 Sart-Dames-Avelines

Code 1495 since at least October 1990.

Transport 
 Villers-la-Ville railway station
 Tilly railway station, in the sub-municipality of Tilly

References

External links
 
 Official website 

 
Sub-municipalities of Villers-la-Ville
Municipalities of Walloon Brabant